Piglet is a fictional character from A. A. Milne's Winnie-the-Pooh books. Piglet is Winnie‑the‑Pooh's closest friend amongst all the toys and animals featured in the stories. Although he is a "Very Small Animal" of a generally timid disposition, he tries to be brave and on occasion conquers his fears.

In the books
Piglet is introduced in the text from Chapter III of Winnie-the-Pooh, although he is shown earlier in one of the illustrations for Chapter II. He also appears in Chapters V, VI, VII, VIII, IX, and X, as well as every chapter of The House at Pooh Corner. Piglet is best friends with Pooh and is also especially close to Christopher Robin and the rest of the main characters.

Like most of the characters, Piglet was based on one of Christopher Robin Milne's stuffed animals. In the original colour versions of Ernest H. Shepard's illustrations in the Winnie‑the‑Pooh books, Piglet has pale pink skin and a green jumper. He is smaller than most animals, being only slightly taller than Roo. His voice is described as "squeaky".

Piglet's adventures in the first book include hunting Woozles, attempting to capture Heffalumps, giving Eeyore a birthday balloon (popped), impersonating Roo in an attempt to trick Kanga, joining the Expotition to the North Pole, and being trapped by a flood. In the second book, he helps build a house for Eeyore, meets Tigger, finds Small while trapped in a gravel pit, plays Poohsticks, gets lost in the mist, and helps rescue Pooh and Owl after they are trapped in Owl's fallen house. For that last feat, Piglet is the subject of a seven-verse "Respectful Pooh Song" that Pooh composes for him.

Piglet himself can read and write, at least well enough for short notes. In the illustrations for The House at Pooh Corner, it appears that Piglet spells his own name "Piglit", although it is rendered as "Piglet" in the actual text even when describing his signature. In one chapter, Piglet is referred to as "Henry Pootel" by Christopher Robin, who claimed to not recognise Piglet after he was thoroughly cleaned by Kanga. Eeyore likes to refer to him as "Little Piglet".

Piglet's favourite food is acorns (or as the book often spells it, "haycorns"). At one point he plants one just outside his house, in hopes of someday having a handy supply. He lives in a house in a beech tree in the Hundred Acre Wood, next to a sign which says "TRESPASSERS W".  An illustration shows that the sign is broken off after the "W." According to Piglet, that is "short for Trespassers Will, which is short for Trespassers William", which was the name of his grandfather (this was a parody of the usual sign "Trespassers will be prosecuted"). Later in The House at Pooh Corner, Eeyore mistakenly offers Piglet's house as a new home for Owl, after Owl's house had blown down. Piglet nobly agrees to let Owl have the house, at which point Pooh asks Piglet to live with him and Piglet accepts.

Adaptations 
In 1960 HMV recorded a dramatised version with songs (music by Harold Fraser-Simson) of two episodes from The House at Pooh Corner (Chapters 2 and 8), with Penny Morrell as Piglet, which was released on a 45rpm EP.

Disney adaptations

Piglet was originally omitted by Disney in the first Pooh film, Winnie the Pooh and the Honey Tree (1966). According to the film's director, Wolfgang Reitherman, Piglet was replaced by Gopher, which was thought to have a more "folksy, all-American, grass-roots image". Many familiar with the classic Milne books protested Disney's decision to exclude Piglet, and Disney relented. Piglet appeared in the next Pooh film, Winnie the Pooh and the Blustery Day (1968).

Disney's interpretation of Piglet has pink skin and a magenta jumper. His fears and nervousness are played up more, as he runs and hides when unnecessary and often stutters when nervous. He has a lot of hidden courage and often faces danger to help others, even when afraid. Stories about him tend to revolve around these traits as well as his small size.

In the Disney cartoons, Piglet is very kindhearted, loves beautiful things like flowers, and prefers keeping things neat and tidy. He sometimes has an inferiority complex, although his friends think highly of him. However, he is often left performing tasks better suited to someone bigger and stronger, such as in several episodes of The New Adventures of Winnie the Pooh or the 2011 film.

Piglet can be found at the Walt Disney Parks and Resorts for meet and greets. He appears less frequently than Pooh, Tigger, and Eeyore, but more than Rabbit. Piglet also made a brief cameo in the 1988 movie Who Framed Roger Rabbit. He was featured as one of the guests in House of Mouse. Piglet also makes a cameo appearance in the DreamWorks animated film Bee Movie along with Pooh; at one point, a man spies Pooh and Piglet eating honey and Barry tells him to "take him out" with a tranquiliser dart.

Appearances

Theatrical featurettes
 Winnie the Pooh and the Blustery Day (1968)
 Winnie the Pooh and Tigger Too (1974)
 Winnie the Pooh Discovers the Seasons (1981)
 Winnie the Pooh and a Day for Eeyore (1983)

Feature-length films
 The Many Adventures of Winnie the Pooh (1977)
 Who Framed Roger Rabbit (1988, brief cameo only)
 Pooh's Grand Adventure: The Search for Christopher Robin (1997) DVD
 Seasons of Giving (1999) DVD
 The Tigger Movie (2000)
 The Book of Pooh: Stories from the Heart (2001) DVD
 Mickey's Magical Christmas: Snowed in at the House of Mouse (2001) DVD
 Mickey's House of Villains (2002) DVD
 A Very Merry Pooh Year (2002) DVD
 Piglet's Big Movie (2003)
 Springtime with Roo (2004) DVD
 Pooh's Heffalump Movie (2005)
 Pooh's Heffalump Halloween Movie (2005) DVD 
 Bee Movie (2007, cameo only) 
 Super Sleuth Christmas Movie (2007) DVD 
 Tigger & Pooh and a Musical Too (2009) DVD 
 Super Duper Super Sleuths (2010) DVD
 Winnie the Pooh (2011)
 Christopher Robin (2018)
 Winnie-the-Pooh: Blood and Honey (2023)

Television series
 Welcome to Pooh Corner (1983–1986)
 The New Adventures of Winnie the Pooh (1988–1991)
 House of Mouse (2001-2003, cameo appearances) 
 The Book of Pooh (2001–2003)
 My Friends Tigger & Pooh (2007–2010)
 Doc McStuffins (guest appearance)

Television specials
 Winnie the Pooh and Christmas Too (1991)
 Boo to You Too! Winnie the Pooh (1996)
 A Winnie the Pooh Thanksgiving (1998)
 A Valentine for You (1999)

Casting history
John Fiedler provided the voice for Piglet from 1968 until his death on June 25, 2005, except in Welcome to Pooh Corner where Phil Baron voiced him. Fiedler's last appearance as Piglet's voice was in Pooh's Heffalump Halloween Movie.  With the exception of Christopher Robin's voice actors Bruce Reitherman and Jon Walmsley, and Roo's voice actor Clint Howard, Fiedler was the last living member of the original Winnie the Pooh voice cast.

Travis Oates has provided Piglet's voice since Fiedler's death, including in Kingdom Hearts II and Pooh's Heffalump Halloween Movie in certain scenes that Fiedler was unable to record before his death. His first major performance as Piglet was in My Friends Tigger & Pooh. He and Jim Cummings were the only actors to return for the 2011 film Winnie the Pooh. Piglet was voiced by Nick Mohammed for the 2018 live-action film Christopher Robin.

Soviet adaptation

In the Soviet Union, a trilogy of short films about Winnie‑the‑Pooh (Russian language: Винни-Пух, or "Vinni Pukh") were made by Soyuzmultfilm (directed by Fyodor Khitruk) from 1969 to 1972. In all three films Piglet, renamed Pyatachok (Пятачок, Pig Snout) and voiced by Iya Savvina, is Pooh's constant companion, even taking Christopher Robin's place in the story concerning Pooh and the honey tree. Unlike the Disney adaptations, animators did not rely on Shepard's illustrations to depict the characters.

Influence on popular culture
The Te of Piglet was written by Benjamin Hoff following the publication of The Tao of Pooh. Both books feature the original drawing of E. H. Shepard. The Te of Piglet details Piglet's exemplification of the Taoist concept of "virtue of the small".

In 1982, whilst studying at Oxford University as an undergraduate, the columnist and commentator Andrew Sullivan adopted the persona of Piglet in holding office in the University Pooh Sticks Club as cited in the 1987 book The Oxford Myth.

See also

 Piglet's Big Movie

References

External links
 Christopher Robin's Toys – the inspiration for Piglet

Winnie-the-Pooh characters
Fictional pigs
Literary characters introduced in 1926
Sidekicks in literature
Film sidekicks
Television sidekicks
Pigs in literature
Male characters in literature